Yew is a common name given to various species of trees, mostly in the genus Taxus. Yew may also refer to:

Place names
 in Singapore:
 Yew Tee,  district
 Yew Tee MRT station
 Yew Lian Park
 in the United Kingdom
 Yew Tree (ward)
 Yew Tree Tarn, a lake in the Lake District
 Yew Tree, West Bromwich
 Kenn Church, Kenn Pier & Yew Tree Farm SSSI

Fictional place names
 Yew alley, a yew-lined walkway in Dartmoor, where Sir Charles Baskerville's body was found in The Hound of the Baskervilles
 Yew Dales (Ýdalir), the home of Ull, the winter god in Norse mythology

Others
 YEW is an acronym for Yokogawa Electric Works
 Lee Kuan Yew (1923–2015), founding father of Singapore, prime minister 1959–1990
 Operation Yewtree - British Police investigation
 You (disambiguation)
 Yew Tree (disambiguation)
 Ewe (disambiguation)